Jackson L. Kiser (June 24, 1929 – October 21, 2020) was an American attorney and jurist who served as a United States district judge of the United States District Court for the Western District of Virginia.

Early life and education
Born in Welch, West Virginia, Kiser earned a Bachelor of Arts degree from Concord College in 1951 and a Bachelor of Laws from Washington and Lee University School of Law in 1952.

Career 
He served as an attorney for the Judge Advocate General's Corps from 1952 to 1955. Afterward, he served as a captain in the United States Army Reserve from 1955 to 1961. Later, he was a United States commissioner for the United States District Court for the Western District of Virginia from 1956 to 1958. He then worked as an assistant United States Attorney of the Western District of Virginia from 1958 to 1961. He was in private practice in Martinsville, Virginia from 1961 to 1982.

Federal judicial service
On November 4, 1981, President Ronald Reagan nominated Kiser to a new seat on the United States District Court for the Western District of Virginia created by 92 Stat. 1629. He was confirmed by the United States Senate on December 3, 1981, and received his commission the same day. He served as Chief Judge from 1993 to 1997. He assumed senior status on April 30, 1997, and relocated his chambers from Roanoke, Virginia to Danville, Virginia. Kiser died October 21, 2020 after a brief illness.

Notable cases
Over the course of his judicial career, Kiser heard and decided a number of highly important judicial questions. Most notably, he was the trial judge for two cases that eventually reached the United States Supreme Court: United States v. Virginia, in which the Supreme Court held Virginia Military Institute's male-only admissions policy unconstitutional, and United States v. Morrison, in which the High Court struck down portions of a federal law for exceeding the scope of Congress' authority under the Commerce Clause.

References

Sources
 

1929 births
2020 deaths
20th-century American judges
Judges of the United States District Court for the Western District of Virginia
United States district court judges appointed by Ronald Reagan
Military personnel from West Virginia
Concord University alumni
People from Welch, West Virginia
United States Army officers
Washington and Lee University School of Law alumni
Virginia lawyers
People from Martinsville, Virginia
Assistant United States Attorneys
21st-century American judges